{|
{{Infobox ship image
|Ship image=Suffren-IMG 8647.jpg
|Ship caption=1/20th scale model of Suffren, lead ship of Breslaws class, on display at the Musée national de la Marine
}}

|}Breslaw''' was a 90-gun  of the French Navy. She was the twenty-second ship in French service named in honour of Louis IX of France.

 Career 
Started as Achille, the ship was renamed Saint Louis'' in 1839. She took part in the Crimean War as a troop ship, and served in the French intervention in Mexico in 1862.

She was used as a prison hulk for prisoners of the Paris Commune, then as an ammunition store, and was eventually broken up in 1886.

Notes, citations, and references

Notes

Citations

References

 90-guns ships-of-the-line

Ships of the line of the French Navy
Ships built in France
1848 ships
Crimean War naval ships of France
Suffren-class ships of the line